Alfred Charles Emery (January 24, 1919 - March 18, 2002) was an American law professor and academic administrator. He served as the president of the University of Utah from 1971 to 1973.

References

2002 deaths
Presidents of the University of Utah
1919 births
American legal scholars
University of Utah faculty
20th-century American academics